Jacob Leo Lucchini (born May 9, 1995) is a Canadian professional ice hockey player currently playing for the Belleville Senators in the American Hockey League (AHL) while under contract to the Ottawa Senators of the National Hockey League (NHL).

Playing career
Lucchini played junior hockey for the Trail Smoke Eaters of the British Columbia Hockey League (BCHL) After junior, he played college hockey for Michigan Tech Huskies for four seasons. Lucchini was a member of two WCHA championship teams and co-captained the Huskies in his senior year. Not drafted by the NHL, he attended the Pittsburgh Penguins training camp in 2018 and was signed to an entry-level contract. He played two seasons for the Penguins' American Hockey League (AHL) affiliate Wilkes-Barre/Scranton Penguins.

During the 2019–20 season, while with Wilkes-Barre, Lucchini was traded by the Penguins along with Joseph Blandisi to the Montreal Canadiens in exchange for Phil Varone and Riley Barber on February 20, 2020. He was immediately reassigned by the Canadiens and played for their AHL affiliate the Laval Rocket.

In 2021, after remaining with the Rocket on an AHL contract, he was later traded by Laval to the Ottawa Senators AHL affiliate Belleville Senators. He had what was considered a "breakout" season with Belleville, scoring 51 points (20 goals, 31 assists) in 72 games. As a free agent, he was signed to a one-year, two-way NHL contract with the Ottawa Senators on July 13, 2022, although he was later assigned to Belleville. During the  season, Lucchini was called up to the NHL Senators and made his NHL debut on December 14, 2022, against the Canadiens. He scored the first NHL goal of his career on January 1, 2023, against the Buffalo Sabres. Lucchini was returned to Belleville after eleven games with Ottawa.

Personal
Lucchini is the son of Sandy and John Lucchini. His younger brother Jeremy also played for the Trail Smoke Eaters in the British Columbia Hockey League (BCHL) and the two played one season together. Jeremy is now a professional player in Europe. His grandfather Leo Lucchini was a member of the Edmonton Mercurys that won the 1950 IIHF World Championship.

Career statistics

Awards and honours

References

External links
 

1995 births
Living people
Belleville Senators players
Laval Rocket players
Michigan Tech Huskies men's ice hockey players
Ottawa Senators players
Trail Smoke Eaters (BCHL) players
Undrafted National Hockey League players
Wilkes-Barre/Scranton Penguins players